Ashwood is a small unincorporated community in Matagorda County, Texas, United States. It is located at the intersection of FM 1728 and County Road 112. The community was established when a railroad was built through the area around 1900. It had a post office between 1910 and 1952 when it closed.

Geography
Caney Creek flows south on the west side of the community.

History
The New York, Texas and Mexican Railway reached Ashwood about 1899–1900 when a branch was built from Wharton to Van Vleck. In its early days, ash logs were shipped from the settlement. In 1910, a post office opened and Mittie D. Hanson was postmaster. In 1914 there were 87 residents and the community had a general store and a mill. Annie M. Smith became the postmaster in 1916 and continued to hold the position until the post office was closed in 1952. Smith also operated the express office and the J. Fisher Smith Mercantile Store. In 1917 Ashwood had a one-room schoolhouse with four grades. In 1925 the population had grown to 200. By the mid-1930s there were two schools, a church, and one business in the community. In 1938 there was a school for African-American children with two teachers. Ashwood's population dropped to 100 in 1942 and to 20 by 1950. By 1967 there were 30 residents and by 2000 there were about 100.

Notes

References

Unincorporated communities in Matagorda County, Texas
Unincorporated communities in Texas